Espen Bredesen (born 2 February 1968) is a Norwegian former ski jumper.

Career
At World Cup level he won gold and silver medals at the 1994 Winter Olympics at Lillehammer.

At the 1992 Winter Olympics, he performed badly, coming last in the normal hill and 57th out of 59 on the large hill. He had converted from the parallel technique to the V-style just a month previously. His poor performance gave him the nickname "Espen the Eagle", based on British ski jumper Eddie 'the Eagle' Edwards.

At the FIS Nordic World Ski Championships 1993 in Falun, he won gold medals both in the team large hill and the individual large hill events. In the 1993/94 season, he won the Four Hills Tournament. He won gold and silver medals at the 1994 Winter Olympics at Lillehammer, and won a silver medal at the FIS Ski-Flying World Championships 1994 in Planica. Bredesen twice beat the world ski flying record with jumps of 209 meters (1994) and 210 meters (1997).

Bredesen also won the ski jumping competition at the Holmenkollen ski festival in 1993. He was awarded the Holmenkollen medal in 1994 (shared with Ljubov Egorova and Vladimir Smirnov).

World Cup

Standings

Wins

Ski jumping world record

WR statement
Bredesen's statement after his first world record in Planica 1994 when he jumped 209m:

References 

Holmenkollen medalists - click Holmenkollmedaljen for downloadable pdf file 
Holmenkollen winners since 1892 - click Vinnere for downloadable pdf file 

 

1968 births
Holmenkollen medalists
Holmenkollen Ski Festival winners
Living people
Norwegian male ski jumpers
Olympic gold medalists for Norway
Olympic silver medalists for Norway
Olympic ski jumpers of Norway
Ski jumpers at the 1992 Winter Olympics
Ski jumpers at the 1994 Winter Olympics
Ski jumpers at the 1998 Winter Olympics
Skiers from Oslo
Olympic medalists in ski jumping
FIS Nordic World Ski Championships medalists in ski jumping
Medalists at the 1994 Winter Olympics
World record setters in ski flying
20th-century Norwegian people